El Naranjo is a town and a municipality in the state of San Luis Potosí in central Mexico.

Geography

El Naranjo is located in an extensive area of tropical and semi-tropical mountains and lowlands called La Huasteca after the Indian civilization and people inhabiting the region.  The town of El Naranjo is in the foothills of the Sierra Madre Oriental.  It received its name because previously an orchard of orange trees (naranjos) was located at the townsite.  The municipality consists mostly of forested mountains with elevations of up to 5,000 feet (1,500 m) and valleys cultivated mostly in sugar cane.  A large sugar refinery is located in the town of El Naranjo.

El Naranjo is noted for three large waterfalls. El Salto, six miles (10 km) north of the town of El Naranjo, is on the river of the same name. A hydro-electric plant drains water from the river and the falls are often dry except during the rainy season in the summer. Below the falls, a canal returns water to the river and for three miles the El Salto River is a "wonderful Class IV blue water river." Several small, 10 to 25 feet (3-8 mt) high waterfalls navigable by expert kayakers are in this section of the river. A stairway leads to observation points and a hotel and restaurant are near the falls.

Below El Meco the El Salto River becomes less turbulent, running peacefully through a valley of sugar cane plantations near the town of El Naranjo.  About nine miles (15 km) south of El Naranjo on a tributary of the El Salto River is the Cascada de Minas Viejas, with a  drop.  Below the principal waterfall is a series of pools and smaller waterfalls dropping over travertine terraces.  Minas Viejas is similar in appearance to Havasu Falls in the Grand Canyon of the United States, although the falls is surrounded by tropical, rather than desert, vegetation.

Climate

El Naranjo features a Dry Winter Humid subtropical climate (Cwa) according to (Köppen) or Cwal (Trewartha) climate. In part due to its higher elevation, while other locations nearby feature a tropical climate. The area sees a pronounced wet season during the northern hemisphere summer with frequent thunderstorms and drier conditions during the winter.

References

Municipalities of San Luis Potosí
Landforms of San Luis Potosí